The state reform law was sanctioned on August 17, 1989, in Argentina, during the presidency of Carlos Menem. It allowed the privatization of state enterprises, and the fusion or disbanding of state organizations. It was proposed by the Justicialist Party and got the support of the Union of the Democratic Centre.

References

Bibliography
 

Presidency of Carlos Menem
Argentine legislation
1989 in law